The Amar Asom (Assamese: আমাৰ অসম)  is an Assamese daily newspaper published by G. L. Publications Ltd. After the exit of Homen Borgohain as the Editor-in-chief, this newspaper tries to maintain its stand by siding with people and vocal against government's anti people policies. The newspaper is published simultaneously from Guwahati and Jorhat.

See also
List of Assamese periodicals

References

External links 
 

Assamese-language newspapers
1995 establishments in Assam
Mass media in Guwahati
Newspapers established in 1995